Mirpur Union is a Union Parishad under Jagannathpur Upazila of Sunamganj District in the division of Sylhet, Bangladesh. It has an area of 28.903 square kilometres and a population of 20358.

Geography 
Mirpur Union is located at the northeast of Jagannathpur Upazila. It shares borders with Bishwanath Upazila in the east, Patli Union and Jagannathpur municipality in the west, Chhatak Upazila in the north, and Syedpur Shaharpara Union in the south. It has an area of 28.903 square kilometres.

Demography 
Mirpur has a population of 17,647.

Administration 
Mirpur constitutes the no. 3 union council of Jagannathpur Upazila.

Economy 
Mirpur has a significant number of British and American immigrants.

Notable people

Sufi Aliyyah-Shah, British-Bangladeshi, self-publisher Oxford resident, born in Mirpur Village of Ward No. 7

Education

References

Unions of Jagannathpur Upazila
Sunamganj District